The Kootenay Ice  (officially stylized as ICE) were a major junior ice hockey team based in Cranbrook, British Columbia, and competed in the Western Hockey League (WHL). The team played its home games at Western Financial Place. The franchise was owned by the Chynoweth family from 1995 until it was sold to Winnipeg-based company 50 Below Sports and Entertainment in 2017.  The Ice moved to Winnipeg in 2019 and now play as the Winnipeg Ice.

History
The franchise began play in 1996 as the Edmonton Ice founded by Ed Chynoweth after he left his position as the Western Hockey League's president. He moved the Ice to Cranbrook in 1998.   The move of the Ice to Cranbrook resulted in the folding of the local Junior A powerhouse Cranbrook Colts and possibly the entire troubled Rocky Mountain Junior Hockey League that the Colts were the top team in. All of the remaining five RMJHL franchises from the Kootenays dropped to the Junior B Kootenay International Junior Hockey League within years of the Ice coming to the region.

The Kootenay Ice were three-time WHL champions (2000, 2002, 2011).  They won the Memorial Cup in 2002, and also participated in 2000 and 2011.

In 2017, the Chynoweth family sold the team to 50 Below Sports + Entertainment Inc.  The company's owners, Greg Fettes and Matt Cockell, were installed as the team's governor and president/general manager, respectively.  A new logo was unveiled on May 1, 2017.

On January 29, 2019, the Kootenay Ice announced the team would relocate to Winnipeg at the end of the 2018–19 season. The move saw the Ice and Swift Current Broncos switch places within the East and Central divisions. The Winnipeg Ice began play in the 2019–20 season.

WHL championships
1999–00: Won, 4–2 vs. Spokane
2001–02: Won, 4–2 vs. Red Deer
2010–11: Won, 4–1 vs. Portland

Season-by-season record
Note: GP = Games played, W = Wins, L = Losses, T = Ties, OTL = Overtime losses, GF = Goals for, GA = Goals against

NHL alumni

Riley Armstrong
Dean Arsene
Matt Berlin
Dan Blackburn
Zdenek Blatny
Mike Comrie
Adam Cracknell
Nigel Dawes
Cody Eakin
Brennan Evans
Cale Fleury
Kris Foucault
Matt Fraser
Jeff Glass
Mike Green
Stanislav Gron
Jason Jaffray
Peyton Krebs
Nathan Lieuwen
Ben Maxwell
Steve McCarthy
Ryan McGill
Brayden McNabb
Duncan Milroy
John Negrin
Luke Philp
Tomas Plihal
Roman Polak
Max Reinhart
Sam Reinhart
Aaron Rome
Ryan Russell
Mackenzie Skapski
Jarret Stoll
Brett Sutter
Marek Svatos
Jaroslav Svoboda
Rinat Valiev
Matt Walker
Kyle Wanvig
Jeremy Yablonski

See also
List of ice hockey teams in British Columbia

References

External links
Kootenay Ice website

Ice hockey teams in British Columbia
Regional District of East Kootenay
Ice hockey clubs established in 1998
Western Hockey League teams
Cranbrook, British Columbia
1998 establishments in British Columbia